The 1976 European Athletics Indoor Championships were held at Olympiahalle in Munich, West Germany, in February 1976. The track used at this edition was 179 metres long.

Medal summary

Men

Women

Medal table

Participating nations

 (3)
 (7)
 (17)
 (14)
 (1)
 (8)
 (6)
 (22)
 (7)
 (10)
 (6)
 (1)
 (4)
 (2)
 (3)
 (1)
 (25)
 (1)
 (8)
 (28)
 (6)
 (9)
 (3)
 (30)
 (4)

References
 Results - men at GBRathletics.com
 Results - women at GBRathletics.com
 The EAA

 
European Athletics Indoor Championships
European Indoor Championships
International athletics competitions hosted by West Germany
Sports competitions in Munich
European Athletics Indoor Championships
1970s in Munich
European Athletics Indoor Championships